Babar Saleem is a Pakistani politician hailing from Swabi District, He is the son of late Dr. Muhammad Saleem Khan, ex-Minister of health KPK.  who is a Previous member of the Khyber Pakhtunkhwa Assembly, belonging to the Pakistan muslim league Nawaz (PMLN). He is also serving as a committee chairman and member if different committees
.

Education
Babar Saleem has Bachelor of Computer Science and Master of Business Administration degrees.

Political career
Babar was elected as the member of the Khyber Pakhtunkhwa Assembly from PK-04 (Peshawar-IV) in 2013 Pakistani general election on ticket of Awami Jamhuri Ittehad Pakistan (later merged to Pakistan Tehreek-e-Insaf).

References

Living people
Pashtun people
Khyber Pakhtunkhwa MPAs 2013–2018
People from Swabi District
Pakistan Tehreek-e-Insaf politicians
Year of birth missing (living people)